Marcus Böhme (born 25 August 1985) is a German professional volleyball player, a member of the Germany national team. The bronze medallist at the 2014 World Championship, and the 2009 European League winner. At the professional club level, he plays for VfB Friedrichshafen.

Honours

Clubs
 CEV Challenge Cup
  2017/2018 – with Olympiacos Piraeus
 National championships
 2007/2008  German Championship, with Berlin Recycling Volleys
 2009/2010  German Championship, with VfB Friedrichshafen
 2010/2011  German Championship, with VfB Friedrichshafen
 2011/2012  German Cup, with VfB Friedrichshafen
 2017/2018  Greek League Cup, with Olympiacos Piraeus
 2017/2018  Greek Championship, with Olympiacos Piraeus
 2018/2019  Greek SuperCup, with Olympiacos Piraeus
 2018/2019  Greek League Cup, with Olympiacos Piraeus
 2018/2019  Greek Championship, with Olympiacos Piraeus

Individual awards
 2003: CEV U19 European Championship – Best Middle Blocker
 2004: CEV U20 European Championship – Best Middle Blocker
 2014: FIVB World Championship – Best Middle Blocker
 2017: CEV European Championship – Best Middle Blocker

References

External links

 
 Marcus Böhme at PlusLiga.pl 
 Marcus Böhme at Volleybox.net 

1985 births
Living people
Volleyball players from Berlin
German men's volleyball players
Olympic volleyball players of Germany
Volleyball players at the 2008 Summer Olympics
Volleyball players at the 2012 Summer Olympics
European Games medalists in volleyball
European Games gold medalists for Germany
Volleyball players at the 2015 European Games
German expatriate sportspeople in Italy
Expatriate volleyball players in Italy
German expatriate sportspeople in Turkey
Expatriate volleyball players in Turkey
German expatriate sportspeople in Poland
Expatriate volleyball players in Poland
German expatriate sportspeople in Greece
Expatriate volleyball players in Greece
German expatriate sportspeople in Russia
Expatriate volleyball players in Russia
Fenerbahçe volleyballers
Cuprum Lubin players
Olympiacos S.C. players